Eudonia albafascicula is a moth of the family Crambidae. It was described by John Salmon in 1956. It is endemic to New Zealand, and can be found on Antipodes Island.

References

Moths described in 1956
Moths of New Zealand
Eudonia
Endemic fauna of New Zealand
Endemic moths of New Zealand